San Rafael Abajo is a district of the Desamparados canton, in the San José province of Costa Rica.

History 
San Rafael Abajo was created on 11 October 1968 by Ley 34. Segregated from San Rafael Arriba.

Geography 
San Rafael Abajo has an area of  km² and an elevation of  metres.

Demographics 

For the 2011 census, San Rafael Abajo had a population of  inhabitants.

Transportation

Road transportation 
The district is covered by the following road routes:
 National Route 105
 National Route 214
 National Route 217

References 

Districts of San José Province
Populated places in San José Province